"(You're So Square) Baby I Don't Care" is a 1957 song recorded by Elvis Presley and performed in the MGM film Jailhouse Rock. It was written by Jerry Leiber and Mike Stoller for the film. Presley plays electric bass on the song.

Background
Elvis Presley's version, one of the few songs in which he plays the electric bass, was recorded on May 3, with the vocal track added on May 9, 1957, and released on his Jailhouse Rock EP. It reached number fourteen on the R&B charts. It later become a minor pop standard, with notable versions being performed by Buddy Holly, who included the song on his eponymous second album, and his version made the British singles chart in 1961, reaching no. 12. A 1983 re-release of the Elvis Presley version reached no. 61 on the UK singles chart.

The song's narrator addresses the object of their affection, and points out all the ways that the addressee is square, how they are out of touch with modern trends in music and romance.  Then the narrator tells the subject of the song that they love them in spite of, and maybe because of this.

Recordings

Other artists besides Presley who have recorded or played the song include:
Buddy Holly
The Beatles played impromptu versions during the White Album sessions, in 1968 and the Get Back Sessions on January 7, 1969
Carl Mann
Cliff Richard
Led Zeppelin (during live medleys)
Joni Mitchell included a cover of it on her album Wild Things Run Fast. This version went to #47 on the US Hot 100.
Bobby Fuller
Don McLean
Scotty Moore
The Professionals
Queen, recorded live during their Magic Tour
Hüsker Dü, played live during the Spin Radio show, 28 August 1985
Brian Setzer
Ray Condo
Bobby Vee
Bryan Ferry
The Primitives
Billy Swan
Johnny Hallyday, French version, recorded 1961 titled "Sentimentale"
Eddy Mitchell, French version, recorded 1963 titled "Sentimental"
Beccy Cole recorded a version in 2010 for her album, Preloved.
Cee Lo Green, on the 2011 compilation Rave On Buddy Holly
Sam Hui, Cantonese version, recorded 1978, titled "咪當我老襯"
John Lennon, appeared on The Complete Lost Lennon Tapes as a home demo
Glitter Band
Rory Storm and the Hurricanes, recorded at the Jive Hive in 1960
Phil Seymour
Jerry Only ( Misfits bassist ), on his solo album Anti-Hero released in 2022

References

External links
 
 Lyrics of Queen's cover of "(You're So Square) Baby I Don't Care" from Live at Wembley '86, from Queen official website.

1957 songs
Buddy Holly songs
Cliff Richard songs
Elvis Presley songs
Pop standards
Songs written by Jerry Leiber and Mike Stoller
Songs written for films